Mongolia participated in the 2007 Asian Winter Games, held in Changchun, China from January 28, 2007 to February 4, 2007.

Medal summary

Medal table
Medals as of January 30, 2007

References

Nations at the 2007 Asian Winter Games
Asian Winter Games
Mongolia at the Asian Winter Games